Gaya Sa Pelikula is a 2020 Philippine web series starring Ian Pangilinan and Paolo Pangilinan. The series serves as a prequel to the unproduced Wattpad teleplays of the same name that features an architecture student who is forced to live with a cocky neighbor after a mishap makes it difficult for him to pay his bills.

Directed by Jaime "JP" Habac Jr. and produced by Globe Studios, the series premiered on YouTube on September 25, 2020, airing on Fridays at 8:00 PM PST. It ran until November 13, 2020, with a total of eight episodes.

Synopsis 
Karl (Paolo Pangilinan), a 19-year old introvert architecture student is in the middle of an identity crisis. Prior to the start of the second semester in college and forced by his parents, he moves into his uncle's condominium unit where he learns to be financially independent.

Karl then takes an online writing job to sustain his daily needs. While expecting the first payout for his work, his client suddenly goes missing in action, thereby making it difficult for him to pay for his monthly dues.

An opportunity presents itself when his cocky neighbor Vlad (Ian Pangilinan) has to hide from his family and proposes to share Karl's space for the rest of the semestral break in exchange of paying up his monthly rent.

Cast and characters  
Below are the cast of the series:

Main  
 Ian Pangilinan as Jose Vladimir "Vlad" Austria
 Paolo Pangilinan as Karl Frederick "Karl" Almasen

Supporting  
 Adrienne Vergara as Judit Austria, Vlad's older sister
 Che Ramos as Adelaida Almasen, Karl's mother
 Chrome Cosio as Mario Almasen, Karl's father
 Yesh Burce as Anna, Karl and Vlad’s neighbor
 Justine Peña as Sue Ching, Vlad’s best friend
 Franco Ramos as Santi Almasen, Karl’s uncle and Mario's brother

Episodes

Season 1 (2020)

Specials

Production

Development 
With Globe Studios producing the web series, they said that it was inspired with the success of 2gether: The Series, a Thai television series, and other similar Asian boys' love content. It also aimed on having "more gay stories told by gay people" as it advocates for LGBTQ+ media representation. A preview of the series' opening scene was released on Wattpad on April 20, 2020.

In a tweet from the series' official Twitter account on June 27, 2020, Jaime "JP" Habac Jr. was named as its director. Habac is notable for directing I'm Drunk, I Love You, a 2017 romantic comedy independent film.

Its teaser was released on September 4, 2020, on YouTube featuring lead actors Paolo Pangilinan and Ian Pangilinan. The series is Paolo's first acting role while it will be Ian's first lead role on screen.

On November 13, Globe Studios postponed the release of the finale and e-fan meet to November 20 to gather support for those affected by Typhoon Ulysses.

Music 
The soundtrack of the series is released by the official Globe Studios playlist on Spotify and platforms on Facebook and Youtube

Release

YouTube 
The teaser was released on September 4, 2020. On September 28, 2020, the official trailer was released on YouTube.

The first episode, "Meet Cute", premiered on YouTube on September 25, 2020, at 8:00 PM (Philippine Standard Time).

Netflix 
The series was released on Netflix in Southeast Asia, Hong Kong, and Taiwan on January 7, 2021.

Reception 
The web series' first episode was released on September 25, 2020. Since then, it has garnered more than 16.3 million total views as of May 22, 2022.

On being compared with other locally produced boys' love series such as Gameboys and Hello Stranger, Habac dismissed that they were "competing with any other BL series" but instead are delighted with its rise as they want to normalize LGBTQIA+ relationships in society by letting the viewers feel that being gay is okay.

YouTube views as of May 22, 2022:

It's Showtime guesting 
On November 9, 2020, lead actors Ian Pangilinan and Paolo Pangilinan appeared as guests in "Mas Testing", a segment of the noontime variety show It's Showtime. The segment features a "tumpak tracer" who needs to "correctly guess which between the two PUT or 'persons under testing' fits a description or does a challenge better." However, the questions asked by hosts Vice Ganda, Vhong Navarro and Jhong Hilario drew flak from netizens as the lead actors were asked on who was more straight, "tigasin", "magaling magpalabas" and "kulot". This prompted netizens on Twitter to highlight the importance of sexual orientation, gender identity, and gender expression awareness and education.

See also 
 Gameboys
 Hello Stranger
 Ben X Jim
 Boys Lockdown
 Oh, Mando!
 The Boy Foretold by the Stars

Notes

References

External links 
 
 
 
 
 Globe Studios YouTube Channel

2020 web series debuts
2020 web series endings
Philippine LGBT-related web series